The Landtag of Bavaria, officially known in English as the Bavarian State Parliament, is the unicameral legislature of the German state of Bavaria. The parliament meets in the Maximilianeum in Munich.

Elections to the Landtag are held every five years and have to be conducted on a Sunday or public holiday. The following elections have to be held no earlier than 59 months and no later than 62 months after the previous one, unless the Landtag is dissolved. The most recent elections to the Bavarian Landtag were held on 14 October 2018.

Bavaria's current state government, formed after the 2018 election, is a coalition of the Christian Social Union (CSU) and the Free Voters (FW). Markus Söder has been Minister-President of Bavaria since March 2018, when he succeeded Horst Seehofer.

History 

The Landtag of Bavaria was founded in 1818, in the Kingdom of Bavaria. The first assembly was held on 4 February 1819. Originally it was called the Ständeversammlung and was divided into an upper house, the Kammer der Reichsräte (House of Councillors), and a lower house, the Kammer der Abgeordneten (House of Representatives). With the act to reform the election of the representatives in 1848 the Ständeversammlung was de facto renamed the Landtag (state diet). The name Landtag was used occasionally before this act.

After the Nazi seizure of power in 1933, the Landtag underwent Gleichschaltung like all German state parliaments. It was dissolved on 30 January 1934 as a result of the "Law on the Reconstruction of the Reich"..

After the Second World War, the new Constitution of Bavaria was enacted and the first new Landtag elections took place on 1 December 1946. Between 1946 and 1999 there was again an upper house, the Senate of Bavaria. The CSU has dominated the Bavarian Landtag for nearly the entire post-war period.

The CSU's 2003 election victory was the first time in the history of the Federal Republic of Germany that any party had won a two-thirds majority of seats in an assembly at any level. Five years later in 2008, the CSU saw a stunning reversal of fortunes, and failed to win a majority of seats in Bavaria for the first time in 46 years. In the aftermath of this result, the SPD floated the idea that the four other parties should all unite to form a government excluding the CSU, as it had "lost its mandate to lead": however, the FDP were not interested.

Composition

Like the Bundestag at the federal level, the Bavarian Landtag is elected through mixed-member proportional representation. There are at least 180 seats, but more are sometimes added as overhang and leveling seats.

As of the 2018 election, the state is divided into 91 electoral districts, which each elect one representative in the same manner as under first-past-the-post. To achieve a proportional result, another 89 seats are on open party lists in the 7 administrative districts of the state, which the constitution define as constituencies. Every constituency elect a fixed number of seats. The 89 seats are assigned such that, also taking into account the 91 districts seats, each party is represented in proportion to its share of the vote in the constituencies. On election day, people vote separately for a candidate in their electoral districts (called the "first vote") and for a candidate in their constituency (called the "second vote").

As of the 2018 election, seats are assigned to the constituency  as follows:

Election results 1946–2018

Source:

Parties:
 AfD: Alternative for Germany – Alternative für Deutschland
 B'90/Grüne: Alliance 90/The Greens – Bündnis 90/Die Grünen
 BP: Bavaria Party – Bayernpartei
 CSU: Christian Social Union of Bavaria – Christlich Soziale Union Bayerns
 FDP: Free Democratic Party – Freie Demokratische Partei
 FW: Independents – Freie Wähler
 GB/BHE: All-German Bloc/League of Expellees and Deprived of Rights – Gesamtdeutscher Block/Block der Heimatvertriebenen und Entrechteten
 KPD: Communist Party of Germany – Kommunistische Partei Deutschlands
 Linke: The Left – Die Linke
 NPD: National Democratic Party of Germany – Nationaldemokratische Partei Deutschlands
 ÖDP: Ecological Democratic Party – Ökologisch-Demokratische Partei
 REP: The Republicans – Die Republikaner
 SPD: Social Democratic Party of Germany – Sozialdemokratische Partei Deutschland
 WAV: Wirtschaftliche Aufbau Vereinigung

See also 
 Bavarian Landtag elections in the Weimar Republic
 1998 Bavarian state election
 2003 Bavarian state election
 2008 Bavarian state election
 2013 Bavarian state election
 2018 Bavarian state election

References

External links
 Official website of the Bavarian Landtag (in German)
 Official website of the Bavarian Landtag (in English)
 Landeswahlgesetz – Laws and regulations governing elections in Bavaria (in German)
 Website of the Bavarian government (in German)
 Website of the Bavarian government (in English)

Bavaria
Politics of Bavaria